Li Jianhua is a retired Chinese footballer who last played as a defender for Guangdong South China Tiger in the China League One.

Club career
He started his career in the 2002 season, quickly establishing himself with 21 appearances and scoring 1 goal in his debut season. Becoming a regular with the Shenzhen Shangqingyin team his highest achievement came in the 2004 Chinese Super League season when Shenzhen won the title, he continued to remain with the team for several further seasons despite them unable to build on their achievements, even flirting with relegation in the 2007 China Super League season. In the beginning of the 2009 season, he transferred to Guangzhou Pharmaceutical F.C., which was later named Guangzhou Evergrande.
Along with his teammates Jiang Ning and Wu Pingfeng, Li transferred to Guangzhou Evergrande's opponent Guangzhou R&F in January 2013. He left Guangzhou R&F at the end of 2015 and played for amateur team Shenzhen Baoxin in 2016. On 9 November 2016, Li was signed by his hometown club Meixian Hakka in the China League Two.

International career
Li Jianhua would make his debut against Mexico on 16 April 2008, coming on as a substitute in a 1-0 friendly loss. He would make another substitute appearance for China against El Salvador for another friendly on 23 April 2008, which ended in a 2-2 draw.

Career statistics 
Statistics accurate as of match played 3 November 2018.

Honours

Club
Shenzhen Jianlibao
Chinese Super League:  2004

Guangzhou Evergrande
Chinese Super League: 2011, 2012
China League One:  2010
Chinese FA Cup: 2012
Chinese FA Super Cup: 2012

References

External links

 

1982 births
Living people
People from Meixian District
Hakka sportspeople
Chinese footballers
Footballers from Meizhou
China international footballers
Shenzhen F.C. players
Guangzhou F.C. players
Guangzhou City F.C. players
Guangdong South China Tiger F.C. players
Chinese Super League players
China League One players
Association football defenders